Day County is a county in the U.S. state of South Dakota. As of the 2020 census, the population was 5,449. Its county seat is Webster. The county is named for Merritt H. Day, pioneer and 1879 Dakota Territory legislator.

Geography

The terrain of Day County consists of rolling hills, partly devoted to agriculture. It is dotted with numerous lakes and ponds, especially its eastern portion. The terrain slopes to the west; its highest point is the northeast corner, at 2,014' (614m) ASL.

Lakes

 Amsden
 Antelope
 Bitter
 Blue Dog
 Enemy Swim
 Horseshoe
 Lynn
 Minnewaste
 Pickerel Lake
 Reetz
 Rush
 Sweetwater
 Waubay

Major highways
 U.S. Highway 12
 South Dakota Highway 25
 South Dakota Highway 27

Adjacent counties

 Marshall County - north
 Roberts County - east
 Grant County - southeast
 Codington County - southeast
 Clark County - south
 Spink County - southwest
 Brown County - west

Protected areas

 Buchner Slough State Public Shooting Area
 Holmquist Slough State Public Shooting Area
 Lily State Public Shooting Area
 Myland Pass State Public Shooting Area
 Nelson Slough State Public Shooting Area
 Pickerel Lake State Recreation Area
 Pierpont Lake Recreation Area
 Waubay National Wildlife Refuge

Demographics

2000 census
As of the 2000 United States Census, there were 6,267 people, 2,586 households, and 1,688 families in the county. The population density was 6 people per square mile (2/km2). There were 3,618 housing units at an average density of 4 per square mile (1/km2). The racial makeup of the county was 91.26% White, 0.13% Black or African American, 7.40% Native American, 0.06% Asian, 0.05% Pacific Islander, 0.16% from other races, and 0.94% from two or more races. 0.38% of the population were Hispanic or Latino of any race. 34.5% were of German, 26.9% Norwegian and 10.9% Polish ancestry.

There were 2,586 households, out of which 27.30% had children under the age of 18 living with them, 54.40% were married couples living together, 6.80% had a female householder with no husband present, and 34.70% were non-families. 31.80% of all households were made up of individuals, and 18.00% had someone living alone who was 65 years of age or older.  The average household size was 2.36 and the average family size was 2.98.

The county population contained 25.50% under the age of 18, 5.20% from 18 to 24, 22.40% from 25 to 44, 23.40% from 45 to 64, and 23.50% who were 65 years of age or older. The median age was 43 years. For every 100 females there were 96.50 males. For every 100 females age 18 and over, there were 94.50 males.

The median income for a household in the county was $30,227, and the median income for a family was $38,011. Males had a median income of $27,279 versus $18,179 for females. The per capita income for the county was $15,856. About 11.40% of families and 14.30% of the population were below the poverty line, including 17.40% of those under age 18 and 11.80% of those age 65 or over.

2010 census
As of the 2010 United States Census, there were 5,710 people, 2,504 households, and 1,561 families in the county. The racial makeup of the county was 88.1% white, 9.5% American Indian, 0.2% Asian, 0.1% black or African American, 0.4% from other races, and 1.7% from two or more races. Those of Hispanic or Latino origin made up 1.1% of the population. In terms of ancestry, 43.8% were German, 25.1% were Norwegian, 12.8% were Polish, 8.8% were Irish, and 6.1% were American.

Of the 2,504 households, 24.4% had children under the age of 18 living with them, 50.0% were married couples living together, 7.9% had a female householder with no husband present, 37.7% were non-families, and 34.0% of all households were made up of individuals. The average household size was 2.22 and the average family size was 2.83. The median age was 47.9 years.

The median income for a household in the county was $36,818 and the median income for a family was $47,949. Males had a median income of $36,549 versus $25,750 for females. The per capita income for the county was $20,542. About 10.7% of families and 12.5% of the population were below the poverty line, including 11.7% of those under age 18 and 14.1% of those age 65 or over.

Communities

Cities
 Bristol
 Waubay
 Webster (county seat)

Towns

 Andover
 Butler
 Grenville
 Pierpont
 Roslyn

Census-designated place 

 Enemy Swim

Unincorporated communities

 Amsden
 Crandall
 Holmquist
 Lily

Townships

 Andover
 Bristol
 Butler
 Central Point
 Egeland
 Farmington
 Grenville
 Highland
 Homer
 Independence
 Kidder
 Kosciusko
 Liberty
 Lynn
 Morton
 Nutley
 Oak Gulch
 Racine
 Raritan
 Rusk
 Scotland
 Troy
 Union
 Valley
 Waubay
 Webster
 Wheatland
 York

Politics
Day County voters have tended to vote Democratic for the past several decades. Since 1948 the county has selected the Democratic Party candidate in 71% of national elections. However, the county swung hard to Donald Trump in 2016, and in 2020 posted the best-ever percentage in the county by a Republican presidential candidate.

See also
 National Register of Historic Places listings in Day County, South Dakota
 Historic Mapworks: Day County 1929 Township Maps

References

External links 
 Day County, South Dakota website

 
1880 establishments in Dakota Territory
Populated places established in 1880